Lamprologus ornatipinnis is a species of cichlid endemic to Lake Tanganyika where it prefers areas with sandy substrates or, sometimes rocky areas.  While not a shell dweller like many of its congeners, it does use shells (and possibly rock crevices) for spawning.  This species can reach a length of  TL.  This species can also be found in the aquarium trade.

References

ornatipinnis
Fish of Lake Tanganyika
Taxa named by Max Poll
Fish described in 1949
Taxonomy articles created by Polbot